James Braddock Jr. is a fictional character appearing in American comic books published by Marvel Comics. The elder brother of the twin superheroes Brian and Betsy Braddock, he is a mutant possessing the ability to manipulate reality in a variety of ways. Though his mutant powers are very powerful, he is limited in that he is also a schizophrenic who believes reality to be his own dream. Originally a supporting character in his brother's solo comic book series, the emergence of his superhuman powers and subsequent mental illness have led him to become a super-villain associated with both Captain Britain and various X-Men comics.

Publication history

Jamie Braddock first appeared in the UK title Captain Britain Weekly #9 (Dec. 1976), and was created by Chris Claremont, Herb Trimpe, and Fred Kida.

Fictional character biography
Jamie is the oldest son of Dr. James and Elisabeth Braddock. Nearly a decade older than his siblings, the twins Brian and Elisabeth ("Betsy"), Jamie had a relatively isolated childhood.

He made his name as a financial genius and was also a successful race car driver. He headed Braddock Industries, a company that flourished under his leadership. Eventually, Jamie discovered his brother's secret identity as Captain Britain and assisted him on several occasions. In his spare time, however, Jamie started to make illegal bets and his debts grew. Soon he became involved with various illegal activities in order to pay his debts. Starting out with minor crimes, Jamie eventually became involved with robbery, murder, and slave-trading in Africa, resulting in him being kidnapped by Doctor Crocodile, an African scientist (also a former R.C.X. agent). He forced Jamie to contact his brother, thinking that Brian was involved with Jamie's crimes as well. Crocodile's witch-doctor created a hallucination for Brian so that she and Crocodile could observe Brian's reaction to the crimes Jamie had committed. Convinced that Brian was innocent, Crocodile told Brian the truth about his brother's actions. Shocked and furious, Brian abandoned Jamie to his fate.

Jamie's treatment at the hands of Doctor Crocodile eventually fractured his mind, leading him to believe that the world around him was merely a dream. The torture and hallucinations forced upon him also awakened his latent mutant power; the ability to warp and restructure reality in his immediate environment. Sat-Yr-9, in the stolen identity of Courtney Ross, learned of Jamie's recently emerged powers, and hired the interdimensional mercenaries known as the Technet to free him. When confronted by the Technet, Crocodile revealed Jamie's crimes to the Technet. The group turned on Jamie, attacking him, but he defeated them easily and erased their memories of these events. He then used his power to transform Doctor Crocodile into an actual crocodile and departed with Sat-Yr-9. Jamie was taken to his family home, Braddock Manor, where he used his reality warping powers to change things back to the way they were in his youth, even resurrecting his family's housekeeper (who was also his childhood nanny), Emma Collins.

Sat-Yr-9 used Jamie's reality warping powers to turn the London criminal known as Vixen into a fox. Moments afterward, he turned her assistant Nigel Frobisher (who had also been sent by Sat-Yr-9 to hire the Technet to free him in the first place) into a duplicate of Vixen. While Frosbisher had wanted to take over Vixen's criminal empire and had told Jamie as much, this was not how he had hoped to do so. After Frobisher got over the initial awkwardness of his situation, he and Jamie used their newly acquired resources to ambush Excalibur, a superhero team Brian had joined. During the ambush, Jamie killed Alysande Stuart and took most of Excalibur and his sister Betsy (who the X-Man called "the Psylocke") captive, torturing them with his powers. He was defeated when Brian's girlfriend Meggan managed to override his powers, allowing Betsy to break free and incapacitate him with her psychic blade. Sat-Yr-9 retrieved Jamie's unconscious body as she escaped. After these events, Jamie would remain comatose for some time, apparently abandoned by Sat-Yr-9 and taken to Muir Island for treatment. His brother and sister attempted to restore him and heal his fractured psyche using Betsy's telepathy, but he ultimately rejected their offer, expelling them from his mind and returning to a catatonic state.

Jamie was briefly seen in Uncanny X-Men #462-465 in the tie-in story of House of M, in which Mad Jim Jaspers, another British villain with reality manipulation powers, also mysteriously reappeared. In Uncanny X-Men #472, he reveals that he was the one who resurrected his sister Betsy one year to the day after she was killed in Spain. In restoring her to life, Jamie also manipulated the quantum forces making up his sister, granting her complete immunity to psionics, magic, and reality-warping. Uatu the Watcher also appears inexplicably, implying that something of cosmic significance is about to happen. Jamie mentions a "cosmic threat" known as the Foursaken that has recently reappeared on Earth. He is pulled through a mysterious portal which the X-Men follow him through. Most of the team is captured, with the exception of Betsy, who was invisible to the Foursaken thanks to Jamie's alterations. During the conflict that follows, Jamie decides that he cannot allow his sister to be used as a pawn again, sacrificing himself instead to save the universe from the First Fallen, the Foursaken's master.

Jamie appears briefly in Captain Britain and MI: 13, helping Brian find his way through an illusion created by the demonic Lord Plokta. Whether this was actually Jamie, or an illusion created by Plokta or Brian's own mind is unknown.

Jamie appears alive once more, alongside his brother and the Captain Britain Corps defending Otherworld from the forces of a powerful sorcerer called The Goat. He offers to "cleanse" Betsy of the changes made to her mind and body over the course of her time with the X-Men, but she refuses. Though he initially appears to be reformed and cured of his insanity, it is eventually revealed that The Goat was in fact a corrupted future incarnation of Jamie who was intent on consuming the multiverse to achieve godhood. As his power grows, Betsy, left with no alternative, telepathically forces her twin, Brian, to kill Jamie by breaking his neck, erasing The Goat from existence and ending his threat to the multiverse.

Jamie however was apparently resurrected by a group of magicians that became his followers, as he turned up alive and well searching for the Space Stone that was under Black Widow care. Using the dark arts he twisted two young boys to literally sniff the Infinity Stone, yet Black Widow was able to put a tracker in one of the magicians in order to find the boys and break Jamie's hold over them. When Black Widow confronted him in his hideout, he had an asp from the Sixth Dimension bite her and inject a venom that would slowly kill her. After Black Widow took out Jamie's followers, she stabbed him several times and severed his legs with a knife, yet this only caused the Sixth-dimensional asps that he had been suppressing, to emerge from his body. With help of the Wizard Merlin (however the Wizard never reveals his identity), Black Widow dealt with the asps which apparently killed Jamie and therefore was able to freed the children under Jamie's control. Black Widow herself was saved from the asp venom by the Wizard.

Dawn of X
Jamie was later resurrected by the X-Men after Krakoa was established as a mutant nation. Soon afterwards a conflict erupts between the mutant nation and Otherworld which ends with Apocalypse demanding parlay with Morgan le Fay. The two meet on the field of battle, and Apocalypse offers his terms - a fight to the death between their two champions, Betsy (the current Captain Britain) and Brian Braddock (the former).

Ensured that Betsy will be resurrected if she loses, due to her refusal to kill Brian, the pair clash. At first it seems a stalemate, with Brian perfectly willing to kill Betsy, but Betsy outfighting him. But the tide suddenly turns as the pair grapple over Brian’s sword and Betsy unexpectedly and unintentionally stabs him in the chest, killing him. Perplexed, Betsy suddenly recognizes the presence of Jamie, who altered probability just enough for Betsy to strike a deathblow against Brian. With Brian dead, Apocalypse demands Morgan's surrender, promising her exile if she allows a new monarch of Otherworld to ascend – Jamie Braddock. Morgan surrenders with little option, and Jamie places her in a cage, saying she doesn’t get to choose her place of exile. He takes the throne, and Apocalypse crowns him King Jamie the First, uniquely poised to be ruler of Otherworld, which is now inextricably linked to the mutant island of Krakoa through the Otherworld gate that was created with Apocalypse’s ritual. Jamie resurrects Brian with his reality-bending powers, and sends everyone home. But all is not over as Jamie Braddock later calls upon a brusque Apocalypse who is secreted in a laboratory and appears to be experimenting on Morgan le Fay, a process the backmatter implies is meant to allow him to engineer an Otherworld/mutant hybrid.

Powers and abilities
Jamie Braddock is an Omega-level mutant possessing the ability to warp reality in his immediate environment. Unlike most mutants, whose powers manifest at puberty or even younger, Jamie's power remained latent well into his adulthood, only emerging as a result of extreme mental duress due to Doctor Crocodile's mystical torture. Jamie's power allows him to perceive the universe as a mass of quantum strings which he can pull and twist to alter the fabric of reality to his whims. Originally, his reality warping was relatively limited; he could only affect dense forms and needed to be close enough to pull on the quantum strings surrounding them. Over time, however, the strength of his power and his control of it have increased substantially; he is no longer limited to dense forms or his immediate surroundings. While not identified, the Wizard Merlin has described him as a psionicist.

Jamie's reality-warping power is immense in scope, limited only by his imagination and fluctuating sanity. He can create portals out of ordinary objects that can transport him across the planet or into other dimensions instantaneously, transform living beings into entirely different forms, grant various superhuman abilities to others (though they tend to fade over time), and can even resurrect the dead, however this particularity apparently can only be used on his own bloodline, as he only demonstrated this ability with his family.

Other versions
An alternate version of him appeared in Excalibur #18, where he killed his brother. Another one is where he was on the side of Brian, facing the Chaos Commanders and the Ayranites.

House of M
In the House of M reality, the Mutant-Human war broke out and he helped preserve the peace. Jamie apparently had manifested mutant powers, and he was proud of his brother having no ill will against mutants. After the Mutant-Human war had calmed, Jamie disappeared without a trace, and Magneto had asked that the oldest should take control of the United Kingdom: Betsy was appointed but refused; Brian accepted.

Ultimate Marvel
In Ultimate Marvel's Ultimate Fallout, Nick Fury is told that the European Union has reconstituted the Excalibur class Super Soldier Program which will be led by Brian's brother, Jamie as the new Captain Britain. He subsequently joined the Ultimates after the deaths of Captains France and Italy. These deaths are part of the world's long-running confrontation with 'The City', an adversarial army that Jamie works closely with Thor in battling.

References

External links
 Jamie Braddock's profile in the Unofficial Handbook of the Marvel Universe
 
 

Characters created by Herb Trimpe
Fictional gamblers
Comics characters introduced in 1976
Characters created by Chris Claremont
Fictional characters who can manipulate reality
Fictional characters with elemental transmutation abilities
Fictional characters with death or rebirth abilities
Fictional characters with dimensional travel abilities
Marvel Comics characters who can teleport
Marvel Comics mutants
Marvel Comics supervillains
Marvel UK characters
Characters created by Alan Davis